Wayne Aberhart (born 10 May 1958) is a New Zealand cricketer who played for Wellington in first-class cricket. His two first-class appearances occurred during the 1985–86 New Zealand cricket season.

References 

1958 births
Living people
New Zealand cricketers
Wellington cricketers
Cricketers from Motueka